Anthem Records is an independent record label based in Toronto, Ontario, Canada. The company was formed in May 1977 by Ray Danniels and Vic Wilson with initial recording artists Rush, Max Webster, Liverpool and A Foot in Coldwater. The three members of Rush, Geddy Lee, Neil Peart and Alex Lifeson became associate directors of Anthem.

Background
The label's predecessor was Moon Records. Anthem was formed so that Rush would have more control of their work at home in Canada (their international deal with Mercury Records initially included Canada), and so other Canadian bands would have a home, as they could not get signed by the major labels' offices in Toronto or Montreal.
Anthem's sister company is SRO Management, also run by Danniels and Wilson, overseeing flagship act Rush and other bands, on and off Anthem.

Lawrence Gowan had also recorded for the label before joining Styx in 1999.

In November 2015, Anthem was acquired by Ole Media Management. In June 2019, Ole rebranded as Anthem.

Discography

See also
 List of record labels

References

External links
 
 Informational essay (archived)

 
Canadian independent record labels
Record labels established in 1977
Rock record labels
Heavy metal record labels
Rush (band)